Mike Epps: Don't Take It Personal is a 2015 Netflix stand-up comedy special by American comic Mike Epps, his first Netflix stand-up special for Netflix. In Don't Take it Personal, directed by L. Frazier, Mike Epps talks about men's habits in their arguments with women, unsuccessful attempts to sell cocaine and more.

Cast
 Mike Epps

Release
It was released on December 18, 2015 on Netflix streaming.

References

External links
 
 
 

2015 television specials
Netflix specials
Stand-up comedy concert films
Epps, Mike: Don't Take It Personal